Here for You may refer to:

 "Here for You" (FireHouse song), 1995
 "Here for You" (Gorgon City song), 2014
 "Here for You" (Kygo song), 2015
 "Here for You" (Maraaya song), 2015
 "Here for You", a song by Wilkinson from the album Cognition, 2022